Zlatá Idka is a village and municipality in Košice-okolie District in the Košice Region of eastern Slovakia.

History
In historical records, the village was first mentioned in 1349 (Ida) when German miners (cives et hospites ac montani de eadem Ida) established here for overworking local gold and silver mines.

Geography
It has a population of 401 people.

Ethnicity
The population is almost entirely Slovak in ethnicity.

Culture
The village has a public library,  a football playground and food facilities.

Transport
The nearest railway station is at Košice.

External links

http://www.cassovia.sk/zlataidka/

Villages and municipalities in Košice-okolie District